Christian Andre Beach (born November 25, 1995),  known professionally as Beach Boii, is an American rapper, singer, and songwriter from Florida. He released his first EP, Bandit, in October 2018.

He is best known for his EP Work released in 2019.

Career
Christian Beach was born in New York City. He released his first single "Fantasy" in 2016. In that same year he released the single "Come Closer". In 2017, Beach released several singles such as "Reach Me", "Shine", and "Rude". In 2018, he released his first EP called Bandit. In early 2019, Beach Boii's single "Rude" was listed as a No. 7 dance hall song by BuzzFeed. In late 2019, he gained local attention by the release of his EP Work.
In early 2020, he gained media attention for the release of his single "2 Cold".

Discography

Albums and EPs

Singles

References

External links
Beach Boii Official Instagram

1995 births
Living people
Rappers from New York City